{{Infobox writer
| embed            =
| honorific_prefix =
| name             = Carl Zuckmayer
| honorific_suffix =
| image            = Bundesarchiv Bild 146-2005-0008, Carl Zuckmayer.jpg
| image_size       =
| image_upright    =
| alt              = Black and white image of Carl Zuckmayer looking at camera
| caption          = Zuckmayer in 1920
| native_name      =
| native_name_lang =
| pseudonym        =
| birth_name       =
| birth_date       = 
| birth_place      = Nackenheim, Rhenish Hesse, Germany
| death_date       = 
| death_place      = Visp, Valais, Switzerland
| resting_place    = Saas-Fee, Valais, Switzerland
| occupation       = 
| language         = German
| nationality      =
| citizenship      = 
| education        =
| alma_mater       =
| period           =
| genre            = 
| subject          = 
| movement         =
| notable_works    =
| spouse           = 
| partner          = 
| children         =
| relatives        =
| awards           = {{hlist|Goethe Prize|Bundesverdienstkreuz|Staatspreis für Literatur|Pour le Mérite|Verdienstkreuz am Band, et al.}}
| signature        =
| signature_alt    =
| years_active     =
| website          = 
| portaldisp       = 
}}

Carl Zuckmayer (27 December 1896 – 18 January 1977) was a German writer and playwright. His older brother was the pedagogue, composer, conductor, and pianist Eduard Zuckmayer.

Life and career

Born in Nackenheim in Rhenish Hesse, he was the second son of Amalie (1869–1954), née Goldschmidt, and Carl Zuckmayer de (1864–1947). When he was four years old, his family moved to Mainz. With the outbreak of World War I, he (like many other high school students) finished Rabanus-Maurus-Gymnasium with a facilitated "emergency" Abitur and volunteered for military service. 

During the war, he served with the German Army's field artillery on the Western Front. In 1917, he published his first poems in the pacifist journal Die Aktion and he was one of the signatures of the "Appeal" published  by the Antinational Socialist Party after the German Revolution of 9 November 1918. By this time, Zuckmayer held the rank of a Leutnant der Reserve (Reserve Officer).

After the war, he took up studies at the University of Frankfurt, first in humanities, later in biology and botany. In 1920, he married his childhood friend Annemarie Ganz, but they were divorced just one year later, when Zuckmayer had an affair with actress Annemarie Seidel.

Zuckmayer's initial ventures into literature and theatre were complete failures. His first drama, Kreuzweg (1921), fell flat and was delisted after only three performances, and when he was chosen as dramatic adviser at the theatre of Kiel, he lost his new job after his first, controversial staging of Terence's The Eunuch. 

In 1924, he became a dramaturge at the Deutsches Theater in Berlin, jointly with Bertolt Brecht. After another failure with his second drama, Pankraz erwacht oder Die Hinterwäldler, he finally had a public success with the rustic comedy Der fröhliche Weinberg ("The Merry Vineyard") in 1925, written in his local Mainz-Frankfurt dialect. This work won him the prestigious Kleist Prize two years after it was awarded to Brecht, and launched his career.

Also in 1925, Zuckmayer married the Austrian actress , and they bought a house in Henndorf, near Salzburg, in Austria. Zuckmayer's next play, Der Schinderhannes, was again successful. 

In 1929, he wrote the script for the movie Der blaue Engel (starring Marlene Dietrich), based on the novel Professor Unrat by Heinrich Mann. That year, he was also awarded the Georg Büchner Prize, another prestigious German-language literary award.

In 1931, his play Der Hauptmann von Köpenick premiered and became another success, but his plays were prohibited when the Nazis came to power in Germany in 1933 (Zuckmayer's maternal grandfather had been born Jewish and converted to Protestantism). 

Zuckmayer and his family moved to their house in Austria, where he published a few more works. After the Anschluss, he was expatriated by the Nazi government, and the Zuckmayers fled via Switzerland to the United States in 1939, where he first worked as a script writer in Hollywood before renting Backwoods Farm near Barnard, Vermont in 1941 and working there as a farmer until 1946. 

In 1943–44, Zuckmayer wrote "character portraits" of actors, writers, and other artists in Germany for the Office of Strategic Services, evaluating their involvement with the Nazi regime. This became known only in 2002, when the approximately 150 reports were published in Germany under the title Geheimreport. The family's Vermont years are narrated in Alice Herdan-Zuckmayer's Die Farm in den grünen Bergen ("The Farm in the Green Mountains"), a bestseller in Germany upon its 1949 publication.

In January 1946, after World War II, Zuckmayer was granted the US citizenship he had applied for already in 1943. He returned to Germany and traveled the country for five months as a US cultural attaché. The resulting report to the War Department was first published in Germany in 2004 (Deutschlandbericht). His play Des Teufels General ("The Devil's General"; the main character is based on the biography of Ernst Udet), which he had written in Vermont, premiered in Zürich on 14 December 1946. The play became a major success in post-war Germany; one of the first post-war literary attempts to broach the issue of Nazism. It was filmed in 1955 and starred Curd Jürgens.

Zuckmayer kept writing: Barbara Blomberg premiered in Konstanz in 1949 and Das kalte Licht in Hamburg in 1955. He also wrote the screenplay for Die Jungfrau auf dem Dach, the German-language version of Otto Preminger's 1953 film The Moon is Blue. Having shuttled back and forth between the U.S. and Europe for several years, the Zuckmayers left the U.S. in 1958 and settled in Saas Fee in the Valais in Switzerland. In 1966, he became a Swiss citizen, and published his memoirs, titled Als wär's ein Stück von mir ("A part of myself"). His last play, Der Rattenfänger, (music by Friedrich Cerha) premiered in Zürich in 1975. Zuckmayer died on 18 January 1977 in Visp. His body was interred on 22 January in Saas Fee.

Zuckmayer received numerous awards during his life, such as the Goethe Prize of the city of Frankfurt in 1952, the Bundesverdienstkreuz mit Stern in 1955, the Austrian Staatspreis für Literatur in 1960, Pour le Mérite in 1967, and the Austrian Verdienstkreuz am Band in 1968.

Translations
 The Moons Ride Over (New York, The Viking Press, 1937, Original title Salwàre oder Die Magdalena von Bozen)
 Second Wind (London: George Harrap & Co., 1941) with an introduction by Dorothy Thompson. His first autobiographical volume, the book covered his youth, his experiences in World War I, and his flight from Austria to America after the Anschluss.
 A Part of Myself, Portrait of an Epoch (New York, Harcourt Brace Jovanovich, Inc., 1970, translated by Winston, Richard and Clara), originally Als wär's ein Stück von mir. Horen der Freundschaft, is an expanded memoir including his experiences in Vermont.
 Des Teufels General appeared in Block, Haskell M. and Shedd, Robert G. Masters of Modern Drama (New York, Random House, 1963) translated by Ingrid G. and William F. Gilbert, and is part of The German Library.
 The Captain of Köpenick appears in German Drama A Late Friendship: The Letters of Karl Barth and Carl Zuckmayer (Grand Rapids, Michigan, William B. Eerdmans Publishing Company, 1982, translated by Geoffrey W. Bromiley)
 Die Fastnachtsbeichte (Carnival Confession) published in English first, by John Geoffrey Gryles Mander and Necke Mander, in 1961 in London.

Honours and awards
 1925: Kleist Prize
 1929: Georg Büchner Prize
 1952: Goethe Prize of the city of Frankfurt am Main
 1952: Honorary Citizenship of his birthplace, Nackenheim
 1953: Medal of the city of Göttingen
 1955: Knight Commander's Cross of the Order of Merit of the Federal Republic of Germany (Großes Verdienstkreuz mit Stern)
 1955: 
 1957: Honorary doctorate from the University of Bonn
 1960: Grand Austrian State Prize for Literature
 1961: Honorary Citizenship of Saas Fee
 1962: Honorary Citizenship of Mainz
 1967: Freeman of the Heidelberg University
 1967: Pour le Mérite for Sciences and Arts
 1968: Austrian Decoration for Science and Art
 1971: 
 1972: Heinrich Heine Prize of the city of Düsseldorf
 1975: Ring of Salzburg

Selected works
Plays
 Der fröhliche Weinberg (1925)
 Schinderhannes (1927)
 Katharina Knie (1928)
 The Captain of Köpenick (1931)
 Des Teufels General (1946)
 Barbara Blomberg. Ein Stück in drei Akten 1949 Konstanz
 Der Gesang im Feuerofen. Drama in drei Akten 1950 Göttingen
 Das kalte Licht. Drama in drei Akten 1955 Hamburg
 Die Uhr schlägt eins. Ein historisches Drama aus der Gegenwart 1961
 Kranichtanz. Ein Akt 1967 Zürich
 Das Leben des Horace A. W. Tabor. Ein Stück aus den Tagen der letzten Könige (Life of Horace Tabor, written 1962–1964) 1964 Zürich
 Der Rattenfänger. Eine Fabel 1975 Zürich, later set as the opera Der Rattenfänger by Friedrich Cerha, 1987 Graz

Filmography
 The Merry Vineyard, directed by Jacob Fleck and Luise Fleck (1927, based on the play Der fröhliche Weinberg)
 The Prince of Rogues, directed by Curtis Bernhardt (1928, based on the play Schinderhannes)
 Katharina Knie, directed by Karl Grune (1929, based on the play Katharina Knie)
 The Captain from Köpenick, directed by Richard Oswald (1931, based on the play The Captain of Köpenick)
 , directed by Max Haufler (1942, based on the play Katharina Knie)
 The Captain from Köpenick, directed by Richard Oswald (1945, based on the play The Captain of Köpenick)
 After the Storm, directed by Gustav Ucicky (1948, based on the stort story Nach dem Sturm)
 , directed by Gustav Ucicky (1950, based on the stort story Der Seelenbräu)
 The Merry Vineyard, directed by Erich Engel (1952, based on the play Der fröhliche Weinberg)
 A Love Story, directed by Rudolf Jugert (1954, based on the stort story Eine Liebesgeschichte)
 , directed by Victor Vicas (1955, based on the novel Herr über Leben und Tod)
 Des Teufels General, directed by Helmut Käutner (1955, based on the play Des Teufels General)
 The Girl from Flanders, directed by Helmut Käutner (1956, based on the play Engele von Loewen)
 The Captain from Köpenick, directed by Helmut Käutner (1956, based on the play The Captain of Köpenick)
 Frauensee, directed by Rudolf Jugert (1958, based on the stort story Ein Sommer in Österreich)
 Der Schinderhannes, directed by Helmut Käutner (1958, based on the play Schinderhannes)
 Carnival Confession, directed by William Dieterle (1960, based on the novel Die Fastnachtsbeichte)
 Der Hauptmann von Köpenick, directed by Frank Beyer (TV film, 1997, based on the play The Captain of Köpenick)

Screenwriter
 1926: Torments of the Night (dir. Curtis Bernhardt)
 1930: The Blue Angel (dir. Josef von Sternberg), based on Professor Unrat by Heinrich Mann
 1931: Salto Mortale (dir. E. A. Dupont), based on a novel by 
 1936: Rembrandt (dir. Alexander Korda)
 1939: Boefje (dir. Douglas Sirk), based on a children's book by 
 1940: Sarajevo (dir. Max Ophüls)
 1953: Die Jungfrau auf dem Dach'' (dir. Otto Preminger), based on a play by F. Hugh Herbert

See also
 Carl Zuckmayer Medal
 8058 Zuckmayer, asteroid named for the writer

References

External links
 
 
 Tabular biography (in German).
 Biography in English.
 German Carl-Zuckmayer-Society (in German; has a bibliography and filmography).
 

1896 births
1977 deaths
People from Mainz-Bingen
People from Rhenish Hesse
Exilliteratur writers
Writers from Rhineland-Palatinate
German expatriates in Austria
German Army personnel of World War I
Kleist Prize winners
Recipients of the Pour le Mérite (civil class)
Knights Commander of the Order of Merit of the Federal Republic of Germany
Georg Büchner Prize winners
Recipients of the Grand Austrian State Prize
Recipients of the Austrian Decoration for Science and Art
Goethe University Frankfurt alumni
People from Windsor County, Vermont
German male dramatists and playwrights
20th-century German dramatists and playwrights
German people of Jewish descent
20th-century German male writers
German male screenwriters
20th-century German screenwriters